Cenocorixa bifida is a species of water boatman in the family Corixidae. It is found in North America.

Subspecies
These two subspecies belong to the species Cenocorixa bifida:
 Cenocorixa bifida bifida (Hungerford, 1926)
 Cenocorixa bifida hungerfordi Lansbury, 1960

References

Articles created by Qbugbot
Insects described in 1926
Corixini